Afolayan is a surname. Notable people with the surname include:

Adeyemi Afolayan, Nigerian film actor, director and producer
Aremu Afolayan, Nigerian actor
Gabriel Afolayan, Nigerian actor and singer
Kunle Afolayan (born 1974), Nigerian actor, film producer and director
Moji Afolayan (born 1969), Nigerian actress, film-maker, producer and director
Oladapo Afolayan (born 1997), British footballer
Toyin Afolayan (born 1959), Nigerian actress